The 47th Signal Battalion "Gennargentu" is an inactive signals battalion of the Italian Army. During the 1990s the unit was active as 47rd Signal Battalion "Gennargentu" and operated and maintained the army's communications network on the island of Sardinia. In 2000 the battalion lost its autonomy and entered the 3rd Signal Regiment as Battalion "Gennargentu". The battalion is based in Cagliari and continues to maintain and operate the army's telecommunication network in Sardinia.

History 
On 31 March 1962 3rd Signal Company of the XLIV Signal Battalion, which was detached to Cagliari in Sardinia, became an autonomous unit. The next day the company was renamed Signal Company of the Sardinia Military Command and assigned to the Sardinia Military Command.

The company consisted of a command, a command squad, a radio platoon, and a wire platoon. In 1967 the two platoons were renamed 1st and 2nd signal platoon.

During the 1975 army reform the army disbanded the regimental level and newly independent battalions were granted for the first time their own flags. During the reform signal battalions were renamed for mountain passes. On 15 November 1975 the Signal Company of the Sardinia Military Command was renamed 47th Signal Company. The same year the company added the 3rd Signal Platoon as company reserve component.

On 15 April 1985 the company was reorganized and now consisted of a command, a command and services platoon, a signal center platoon, a telecommunications (TLC) management platoon, and a field support platoon. The latter platoon was placed in reserve status on 1 January 1990.

On 1 Oct 1996 the company was expanded to 47th Signal Battalion "Gennargentu". On 18 September 1996 the battalion was granted a flag by the President of the Italian Republic Oscar Luigi Scalfaro. The battalion consisted of four companies: Command and Services Company, Signal Center Company, TLC Network Management Company, which were based in Cagliari, and the Field Support Company, which was based in Nuoro.

In 2000 the battalion was disbanded and with its personnel the Battalion "Gennargentu" was formed, which joined the 3rd Signal Regiment, while flag of the 47th Signal Battalion "Gennargentu" was transferred to the Shrine of the Flags in the Vittoriano in Rome.

Current structure 
As of 2022 the Battalion "Gennargentu" consists of:

  Battalion "Gennargentu", in Cagliari
 Command and Logistic Support Company
 6th C4 Support Signal Company 
 Area Support Signal Platoon

The Command and Logistic Support Company fields the following platoons: C3 Platoon, Transport and Materiel Platoon, Medical Platoon, and Commissariat Platoon.

References

Signal Regiments of Italy